The 1987 Oregon Ducks football team represented the University of Oregon in the 1987 NCAA Division I-A football season. Playing as a member of the Pacific-10 Conference (Pac-10), the team was led by head coach Rich Brooks, in his eleventh year, and played their home games at Autzen Stadium in Eugene, Oregon. They finished the season with a record of six wins and five losses (6–5 overall, 4–4 in the Pac-10).

Schedule

Reference:

Personnel

Season summary

Ohio State

{{Americanfootballbox
|bg=
|bg2=
|titlestyle=; text-align:center
|state=collapsed
|title=Oregon Ducks at Ohio State Buckeyes
|date=September 19, 1987
|time=1:30 p.m.
|road=Oregon
|R1=0 |R2=0 |R3=0 |R4=14
|home=Ohio St
|H1=0 |H2=3 |H3=14 |H4=7
|stadium=Ohio Stadium, Columbus, Ohio
|attendance=89,882
|weather=Sunny, 
|referee=Jerry Hendrickson
|TV=
|TVAnnouncers=
|reference=Box Score
|scoring=
Second quarter
OSU – Matt Frantz 34-yard field goal, 8:01. Ohio St 3–0. Drive: 11 plays, 47 yards, 4:04.
Third quarter
OSU – Jay Koch 4-yard pass from Tom Tupa (Matt Frantz kick), 4:29. Ohio St 10–0. Drive: 14 plays, 88 yards, 6:23.
OSU – George Cooper 19-yard pass from Tom Tupa (Matt Frantz kick), 3:15. Ohio St 17–0. Drive: 1 play, 19 yards, 0:09.
Fourth quarterORE – Joe Meerten 8-yard pass from Bill Musgrave (Kirk Dennis kick), 6:40. Ohio St 17–7. Drive: 2 plays, 8 yards, 0:13.''OSU – Vince Workman 5-yard run (Matt Frantz kick), 3:17. Ohio St 24–7. Drive: 8 plays, 80 yards, 3:23.
ORE – Rod Green 7-yard pass from Bill Musgrave (Kirk Dennis kick), 1:47. Ohio St 24–14. Drive: 7 plays, 77 yards, 1:23.
|stats=
Top passers
ORE – Bill Musgrave – 18/27, 205 yards, 2 TD
OSU – Tom Tupa – 20/32, 234 yards, 2 TD
Top rushers
ORE – Latin Berry – 18 rushes, 33 yards
OSU – Vince Workman – 27 rushes, 162 yards, TD
Top receivers
ORE – Terry Obee – 4 receptions, 63 yards
OSU – Vince Workman – 5 receptions, 63 yards
}}

Team players drafted into the NFLReference:'''

References

Oregon
Oregon Ducks football seasons
Oregon Ducks football